Sumiyoshi (written: 住吉) may refer to:

Sumiyoshi (name)
, Shinto shrine in Osaka, Japan
, ward of Osaka, Japan
, prefectural park in Osaka, Japan
, multiple train stations in Japan
Sumiyoshi sanjin, generic name for three Shinto gods of the sea
Sumiyoshi-zukuri, Shinto architectural style